The 2017 Fred's 250 powered by Coca-Cola was the 19th stock car race of the 2017 NASCAR Camping World Truck Series, the third race of the 2017 NASCAR Camping World Truck Series playoffs, the third and final race of the Round of 8, and the 12th iteration of the event. The race was held on Saturday, October 14, 2017, in Lincoln, Alabama at Talladega Superspeedway, a  permanent D-shaped superspeedway. The race was extended from 94 laps to 95 laps, due to a NASCAR overtime finish. At race's end, Parker Kligerman, driving for Henderson Motorsports, took advantage of the lead on the final restart, and earned his second career NASCAR Camping World Truck Series win, after a caution came out on the final lap. To fill out the podium, Christopher Bell and Myatt Snider of Kyle Busch Motorsports would finish second and third, respectively.

Christopher Bell, Johnny Sauter, Matt Crafton, Ben Rhodes, Austin Cindric, and John Hunter Nemechek would advance into the Round of 6.

Background 

The race was held at Talladega Superspeedway, which is a motorsports complex located north of Talladega, Alabama. It is located on the former Anniston Air Force Base in the small city of Lincoln. A tri-oval, the track was constructed in 1969 by the International Speedway Corporation, a business controlled by the France Family. , the track hosts the NASCAR Cup Series, NASCAR Xfinity Series, NASCAR Camping World Truck Series, and ARCA Menards Series. The total peak capacity of Talladega is around 175,000 spectators, with the main grandstand capacity being about 80,000.

Entry list 

 (R) denotes rookie driver.
 (i) denotes driver who is ineligible for series driver points

Practice

First practice 
The first practice session was held on Friday, October 13, at 11:00 AM CST. The session would last for 55 minutes.

Final practice 
The final practice session was held on Friday, October 13, at 1:00 PM CST. The session would last for 55 minutes.

Qualifying 
Qualifying was held on Saturday, October 14, at 9:30 AM CST. Since Talladega Superspeedway is at least , the qualifying system was a single car, single lap, two round system where in the first round, everyone would set a time to determine positions 13–32. Then, the fastest 12 qualifiers would move on to the second round to determine positions 1–12.

Full qualifying results 

 *Time unavailable.

Race results 
Stage 1 Laps: 20

Stage 2 Laps: 20

Stage 3 Laps: 55

Standings after the race 

Drivers' Championship standings

Note: Only the first 8 positions are included for the driver standings.

References 

2017 NASCAR Camping World Truck Series
NASCAR races at Talladega Superspeedway
October 2017 sports events in the United States
2017 in sports in Alabama